Epomediol (trade name Clesidren) is a synthetic terpenoid with choleretic effects. It has been used in the symptomatic treatment of itching due to intrahepatic cholestasis of pregnancy.

References

Monoterpenes